Stephan von Breuning (17 August 1774 – 4 June 1827) was a German civil servant and librettist. He was Ludwig van Beethoven's lifelong friend, from his childhood in Bonn when receiving music lessons until acting as executor in Vienna.

Life 

Born in Bonn, Breuning was the son of Emanuel Joseph von Breuning and his wife Helene von Breuning, also known as Beethoven's second mother. In 1784, the family made the acquaintance of Ludwig van Beethoven in their home at Bonn. He became a close friend to the family and gave piano lessons to the Breuning children Eleonore and Lorenz.

In 1801, Breuning moved to Vienna where four years later Beethoven's Fidelio was premiered. Besides Joseph Sonnleithner and Georg Friedrich Treitschke, Breuning also contributed to the libretto. In 1806, Beethoven dedicated his violin concerto op. 61 to his friend. Following Beethoven's death in 1827, Breuning assisted in handling affairs of the estate, but he died at age 52 only a few months after the composer. The plan to publish a Beethoven biography, which Breuning had considered writing in collaboration with Beethoven's childhood friend and Breuning's brother-in-law Franz Gerhard Wegeler and Anton Schindler, could not be realized.

Family 
In April, 1808, Breuning married Julie von Vering (1791–1809), the daughter of Beethoven's physician Gerhard von Vering (1755-1823), to whom Beethoven dedicated the piano version of his Violin Concerto. Julie died at age 17, less than a year after their marriage. Around 1812, Breuning began a relationship with Constanze Ruschowitz (1785-86 in Freudenthal, Austrian Silesia, – 5 October 1856 in Vienna), whom he married on 18 February 1817. She had three children: 
 Gerhard von Breuning, 
 Helena Juliana Philippina von Breuning (born 17 August 1818), 
 Mara Magdalena Barbara von Breuning (born 2 April 1821).

Further reading 
 Ludwig Nohl, Drei Freunde Beethovens. Über Beethovens Beziehung zu Ignaz von Gleichenstein, Stephan von Breuning und Johann Malfatti, in the Allgemeine deutsche Musikzeitung, Jg. 6 (1879), Nr. 39 dated 26.9., ; Nr. 40 dated 3.10., ; Nr. 41 dated 10.10., ; Nr. 42 dated 17.10., ; Nr. 43 dated 24.10., 
 Stephan Ley, Beethoven als Freund der Familie Wegeler – von Breuning, Bonn 1927
 Grove Dictionary of Music and Musicians
 Martella Gutiérrez-Denhoff, Neue Mosaiksteine im Bild der Familie von Breuning. Ein Beitrag zum geistig-sozialen Umfeld des heranwachsenden Beethoven in Bonn, in: Musikalische Quellen – Quellen zur Musikgeschichte. Festschrift für Martin Staehelin zum 65. Geburtstag, published by Ulrich Konrad, Göttingen: Vandenhoeck & Ruprecht, 2002,

References

External links 
 Stephan von Breuning, Gedicht für seine Braut Julie von Vering, Wien, 2. Mai 1806
 

German librettists
1774 births
1827 deaths
Writers from Bonn